The Cuinarana River is a river in the state of Pará, Brazil, a tributary of the Marapanim River.

Course

The river originates near the village of Magalhães Barata, and flows north to the point where it enters the Marapanim River.
The mangroves of the east side of the Cuinarana River are protected by the Maracanã Marine Extractive Reserve.
On the west side the mangroves are protected by the Cuinarana Marine Extractive Reserve.
The west bank of the Marapanim River, and the peninsula to the left of the mouth of the estuary formed by the Marapanim and Cuinarana rivers is protected by the Mestre Lucindo Marine Extractive Reserve.

Environment

The mouth of the river is mainly mud flats.
The area around Rio Cuinarana has a low population, with about 18 people per square kilometre.
The area has a monsoon climate.
Rainfall averages  annually. 

See also
List of rivers of Pará

References

Sources

Rivers of Pará
Tributaries of the Amazon River